Omsky District is an administrative and municipal district (raion), one of the thirty-two in Omsk Oblast, Russia. It is located in the southern central part of the oblast. Its administrative center is the rural locality (a settlement) of Rostovka. Population: 94,086 (2010 Census);  The population of Rostovka accounts for 5.8% of the district's total population.

References

Notes

Sources

Districts of Omsk Oblast